Glenn Anderson (born 1960) is a retired Canadian pro hockey player.

Glenn Anderson may also refer to:
 Glenn M. Anderson (1913–1994), former Lieutenant Governor of California and United States congressman
 Glenn M. Anderson Freeway or  Interstate 105
 Glenn S. Anderson (born 1954), Michigan State Senate member
 Glenn Anderson (Washington politician) (born 1958)
 Glenn B. Anderson, first Black deaf man to earn a doctoral degree